The Main Event may refer to:

Film and television
 The Main Event (1927 film), directed by William K. Howard
 The Main Event (1938 film), 1938 American comedy-drama film directed by Danny Dare
 The Main Event (1979 film), romantic comedy starring Barbra Streisand and Ryan O'Neal
 The Main Event (2020 film), comedy starring Seth Carr, Tichina Arnold, Ken Marino, and Adam Pally
 Main Event (TV channel), Australia's only pay-per-view channel
 World Wrestling Entertainment television programming, including
 Saturday Night's Main Event, series airing on NBC (1985–1992, 2006–2008)
 WWF The Main Event, a Friday night spin-off (1988–1991)
 WWE Main Event, a current weekly program series launched in 2012
 WCW Main Event, a professional wrestling series airing on TBS (1988–1998)
 The Main Event (Australian game show), Australian television game show that aired from 1991 to 1992 on the Seven Network

 Sky Sports, Main Event, a TV channel

Music
 The Main Event – Live, a 1974 Frank Sinatra recording
 The Main Event (album), the 2000 Fingathing debut
 "The Main Event" (Chamillionaire song), 2010
 The Main Event (1998 concert tour), an Australian concert tour featuring John Farnham, Olivia Newton-John and Anthony Warlow
The Main Event (2015 concert tour), an American concert tour featuring New Kids on the Block, TLC and Nelly
 "The Main Event/Fight", the 1979 disco song by Barbra Streisand

Video games
 The Main Event (video game), a professional wrestling game released in 1988
 WCW: The Main Event, 1994 game featuring characters from World Championship Wrestling
 Mike Tyson: Main Event, a 2011 iPhone game developed by RockLive featuring boxer, Mike Tyson

Nicknames
 "The Main Event", a nickname of professional wrestler Shawn Michaels 
 "Main Event", streetball nickname of basketball player Waliyy Dixon

Other uses
 "The Main Event", World Series of Poker annual championship tournament
 The Main Event (video), a video, released in 1999, of a tour The Main Event Tour by singers Olivia Newton-John, John Farnham and Anthony Warlow
 "The Main Event", the name of a V8 Supercars event in 2003, later known as the Grand Finale
 Main Event Entertainment, a U.S. chain of entertainment facilities that features bowling, video games, and billiards
 "Main Event Media", a media company working with Nickelodeon's Top Elf